Boreal sagebrush is a common name for several shrubs in the genus Artemisia:

Artemisia arctica
Artemisia norvegica